State Road 164 in the U.S. State of Indiana is a short east–west two-lane highway in the southwest portion of the state.

Route description
State Road 164 begins in downtown Jasper at the U.S. Route 231 and Courthouse Square intersection.  Passing east out of town, the road winds through the country, passing to the south of Jasper Lake and through the small town of Celestine.  Just before leaving Dubois County for Crawford County, it crosses an arm of Patoka Lake; it then passes through the small town of Wickliffe on the edge of the Hoosier National Forest before terminating at State Road 145 on the shores of another arm of the lake.

Major intersections

References

164
Transportation in Crawford County, Indiana
Transportation in Dubois County, Indiana